C4orf19 (Chromosome 4 open reading frame 19) is a protein which in humans is encoded by the C4orf19 gene.

Gene 
The C4orf19 gene is located at 4p14 on the plus strand of chromosome 4 and spans 170.04 kb and contains 7 exons. The genetic neighborhood of C4orf19 includes LOC101928721, LOC105374402, MIR4801, and NWD2, all located upstream of C4orf19. RELL1 is located downstream of C4orf19.

mRNA 

There are four known transcript variants that encode isoforms known as transcript variant 1, transcript variant 2, X1, and X2.

Protein 

C4orf19 encodes a protein with 314 amino acids and a molecular weight of 33.7 kDa. The theoretical isoelectric point of C4orf19 is 4.4.

Domains and motifs 
In humans, the C4orf19 protein contains one domain of unknown function, DUF4699. In eukaryotes the DUF4699 family of proteins are typically between 303 and 319 amino acids in length. DUF4699 spans from amino acid 9 to amino acid 314 in C4orf19. Amongst orthologous proteins, the N-terminus and C-terminus of C4orf19 are most highly conserved.

Secondary structure 
Alpha helices are predicted near the N-terminus and C-terminus of C4orf19 in areas that are conserved amongst orthologous proteins.

Post-translational modifications 
C4orf19 is predicted to undergo several post-translation modifications, including phosphorylation, glycosylation, and SUMOylation.

Subcellular localization 
C4orf19 is predicted to be to be localized in cellular junctions.

Expression 
C4orf19 is highly expressed in tissues of the salivary gland, duodenum, small intestine, colon, rectum and kidney. The protein also shows medium levels of expression in tissues of the stomach.

Interacting proteins 
Studies using yeast two-hybrid screening have experimentally determined interactions between C4orf19 and PDCD10.

Homology

Paralogs 
There are currently no known paralogs or paralogous domains for C4orf19.

Orthologs 
Orthologs of C4orf19 have been found in mammals, birds, and reptiles. Within class Mammalia, orthologs have been identified in orders Primates, Rodentia, Artiodactyla, Chirpotera, Carnivora, Cingulata, and Diprotodontia. The Burmese python (Python bivittatus) and Eastern fence lizard (Sceloporus undulatus) contain the most distantly related orthologs of C4orf19. Both species diverged from humans an estimated 312 million years ago. C4orf19 orthologs have not yet been identified in bacteria, archaea, protists, plants, fungi, trichoplax, invertebrates, or bony and cartilaginous fish. The following table represents a selection of orthologs found using searches in BLAST.

References